Mucilaginibacter calamicampi is a Gram-negative, aerobic and rod-shaped bacterium from the genus of Mucilaginibacter which has been isolated from soil from a reed field in Korea.

References

External links
Type strain of Mucilaginibacter calamicampi at BacDive -  the Bacterial Diversity Metadatabase

Sphingobacteriia
Bacteria described in 2013